Richard Heron Avis Hutton (October 4, 1923 – November 24, 2003) was an American amateur and professional wrestler. He was a three-time NCAA champion and, as a professional, held the NWA World Heavyweight Championship, making him a one-time world champion in professional wrestling.

Early life 
Hutton was born in Amarillo, Texas to Bailey and Gladys Hutton. He had one brother, Jerald Hutton. He moved to Tulsa, Oklahoma where he became a two-time state finalist for Daniel Webster High School. later on Dick joined the army and was a veteran of World War II.
He attended Oklahoma A&M.

While at Oklahoma A&M he was the NCAA wrestling champion three times, in 1947, 1948 and 1950 (In 1949 he lost in the finals to Verne Gagne, future professional wrestler).

Also while at Oklahoma A&M, he went to the 1948 Olympic Games. He came 7th in Freestyle wrestling.

Professional wrestling career 
Hutton made his debut in 1952, in a loss against Bill Longson. Hutton left Tulsa, as it was primarily a territory for light-heavyweight wrestlers, and went to Texas.

While in Columbus, Ohio, in a territory run by Al Haft, Hutton would wrestle members of the audience. Beating Hutton would've earned the fan $1,000. No one ever won.

Hutton developed a friendship with Lou Thesz. After several competitive training contests with Hutton, Thesz considered him to be the best wrestler he'd ever faced and chose Hutton to be the next NWA World Champion, winning the title from himself. On November 14, 1957, in Toronto's Maple Leaf Gardens 10,000 people saw Hutton beat Thesz for the belt after 35:15, when Thesz submitted to an abdominal stretch.

He teamed regularly with Gene Kiniski in Toronto.

On January 9, 1959, after a championship reign of 421 days, Hutton dropped the belt to Pat O'Connor.

Hutton never really had much other success in professional wrestling. He was criticised by some people for having a lack of charisma with poor drawing ability. However, many other wrestlers praised his wrestling ability.

Hutton was forced into retirement because of heart trouble and other injuries.

Personal life 
Hutton was married to Katherine. He died on November 24, 2003.

Championships and accomplishments

Amateur wrestling 
 National Collegiate Athletic Association
 NCAA Wrestling Championship (3 times) - in 1947, 1948, and 1950
 NCAA Hall Of Fame Inductee
 Oklahoma State University
 Oklahoma State University Wrestling Hall of Fame Inductee
 National Wrestling Hall of Fame Inductee
 Olympic Games
 1948 Olympic Freestyle Wrestling - seventh place

Professional wrestling 
 50th State Big Time Wrestling
 NWA Hawaii Heavyweight Championship (1 time)
 Cauliflower Alley Club
Other honoree (1994)
 George Tragos/Lou Thesz Professional Wrestling Hall of Fame
 Class of 2000
 Maple Leaf Wrestling
 NWA Canadian Open Tag Team Championship (1 time) - with Hard Boiled Haggerty
 National Wrestling Alliance
 NWA World Heavyweight Championship (1 time)
 NWA Western States Sports
 NWA North American Tag Team Championship (Amarillo version) (1 time) - with Dory Funk
 NWA World Tag Team Championship (Amarillo version) (2 times) - with Dory Funk
 Worldwide Wrestling Associates
 WWA International Television Tag Team Championship (1 time) - with Sam Steamboat
 Other titles
 Ohio Heavyweight Championship (2 times)

References

External links 

 Article on Dick Hutton
 

1923 births
2003 deaths
American male professional wrestlers
American male sport wrestlers
NWA World Heavyweight Champions
Oklahoma State Cowboys wrestlers
Oklahoma State University alumni
Olympic wrestlers of the United States
Professional wrestlers from Texas
Sportspeople from Amarillo, Texas
Stampede Wrestling alumni
Wrestlers at the 1948 Summer Olympics
20th-century professional wrestlers
NWA Canadian Open Tag Team Champions
NWA Canadian Tag Team Champions (Calgary version)